The rufous shrikethrush (Colluricincla rufogaster) is a species of bird in the family Pachycephalidae.

Taxonomy and systematics
This species was formerly considered a conspecific member of the little shrikethrush complex. Genetic investigations of New Guinea populations of the little shrikethrush indicate high levels of genetic divergence, suggesting it comprised more than one species.

Subspecies
Currently, three subspecies are recognized:
 Colluricincla rufogaster rufogaster - Gould, 1845: Describing the type of the species. Found in south-eastern Queensland and north-eastern New South Wales (eastern Australia)
 C. rufogaster goodsoni - (Hartert, E, 1930): Found on south Gulf of Carpentaria and Cape York Peninsula to Torres Strait islands, coastal Trans-Fly region of New Guinea
 C. rufogaster griseata - (Gray, GR, 1858): Originally described as a separate species. Found in north-eastern Queensland (Australia)

Distribution and habitat
It is found in New Guinea and Australia. Its natural habitats are subtropical or tropical moist lowland forests and subtropical or tropical moist montane forests.

Behaviour and ecology
During a study of toxicity in birds, two specimens of this species were tested. One of these specimens contained traces of batrachotoxins (BTXs) similar to those found in the secretions of Central and South American poison dart frogs.

References

Rufous shrikethrush
Birds of New Guinea
Birds of Australia
Rufous shrikethrush
Rufous shrikethrush
Toxic birds